Parides tros is a species of butterfly in the family Papilionidae. It is found in the Neotropical realm where it is endemic to Brazil.

The larva feeds on Aristolochia species including A. rumicifolia, A. cynanchifolia (P. t. tros), A. triangularis (P. t. danunciae).

Subspecies
Parides tros tros (Brazil: Espirito Santo, Rio de Janeiro, São Paulo)
Parides tros danunciae Mielke, Casagrande & Mielke, 2000 (Brazil: Paraná, Santa Catarina)

Description from Seitz

P. dardanus Fabr. (= tros Fabr. = opleus Godt) (2 c). Tailed. Forewing in the male with a green spot before the hindmargin; the red area of the hindwing not opalescent. Female with a white area on the forewing, with obsolete margins. — An exclusively Brazilian species, which hitherto is only known from the province of Rio de Janeiro.

Description from Rothschild and Jordan(1906)

A full description is provided by Rothschild, W. and Jordan, K. (1906) as dardanus Fabr.

Taxonomy

Parides tros is a member of the aeneas species group

The members are
Parides aeneas 
Parides aglaope 
Parides burchellanus 
Parides echemon 
Parides eurimedes 
Parides lysander 
Parides neophilus 
Parides orellana 
Parides panthonus 
Parides tros 
Parides zacynthus

References

Butterflies described in 1793
Parides
Papilionidae of South America